Two ships of the Republic of Singapore Navy (RSN) have been named RSS Endurance:

 The first RSS Endurance (LS201) was the former USS Holmes County, an LST-542-class tank landing ship sold to the RSN in 1975.
 The second  is an Endurance-class landing platform dock ship launched in 1998 and currently in service.

Ships of the Republic of Singapore Navy